

Qualification system
A quota of 150 equestrian riders (45 dressage, 50 eventing and 55 show jumping) will be allowed to qualify. A maximum of twelve athletes can compete for a nation across all events (with a maximum of four per event). Athletes qualified through various qualifying events and rankings. The current qualification standings after the Central American and Caribbean Games:

Qualification summary

Dressage
9 teams of four (or three) athletes each will qualify, along with nine athletes as individuals (with a maximum of two per NOC), for a total of 45. A nation with at least three qualified athletes, may enter the team event as well.

Team

Costa Rica only entered 3 athletes.

Individual

Eventing
11 teams of four athletes each will qualify, along with six athletes as individuals (with a maximum of two per NOC) for a total of 50.

Team

Individual

Jumping
11 teams of four athletes each will qualify, along with eleven athletes as individuals, for a total of 55.

Team

Individual

End notes 

Only one eligible team competed at the World Equestrian Games. This meant the second team slot was reallocated to the Central American and Caribbean Games, as no there were no other teams that contested the South American Games. This meant four team slots (as opposed to three) were available at those games.
Only one eligible athlete (from Colombia) competed at the World Equestrian Games. This meant the two remaining individual slots were reallocated, to the  Central American and Caribbean Games. This meant five individual slots (as opposed to three) were available at those games. Colombia later won a team spot at the Central American and Caribbean Games, meaning the a sixth individual quota was available at the said games. 
El Salvador qualified four athletes individually, and will be allowed to enter a composite eventing team as well. However it rejected two quotas, and this cannot enter in the team competition. 
Only three individual spots were eligible at the South American games. The fourth spot was transferred to the world rankings.

References

P
P
Qualification for the 2015 Pan American Games
Equestrian at the 2015 Pan American Games